C. Ed Massey (born October 14, 1967) is an American attorney and politician serving as a member of the Kentucky House of Representatives from the 66th district. Elected in November 2018, he assumed office on January 1, 2019.

Early life and education 
Massey was born in Hebron, Kentucky in 1967. He earned a Bachelor of Science degree in criminal justice and police science from Eastern Kentucky University and a Juris Doctor from the Salmon P. Chase College of Law at Northern Kentucky University.

Career 
Massey is licensed to practice law in Kentucky, Ohio, and Indiana. In 2012 and 2013, he was the president of the National School Boards Association. He was also a board member of the National PTA, National Underground Railroad Freedom Center, New York Says Thank You Foundation, American Public Education Foundation, and Boone County Schools. Since 2008, he has worked as an attorney at Blankenship Massey & Associates. Massey was elected to the Kentucky House of Representatives in November 2018 and assumed office on January 1, 2019. He also serves as chair of the House Judiciary Committee.

References 

Living people
1967 births
People from Hebron, Kentucky
Eastern Kentucky University alumni
Northern Kentucky University alumni
Salmon P. Chase College of Law alumni
Kentucky lawyers
Republican Party members of the Kentucky House of Representatives